The Wanderer is a 1925 American silent drama film directed by Raoul Walsh and starring Greta Nissen, Wallace Beery, and Tyrone Power, Sr. It was distributed by Paramount Pictures.

Plot
As described in a film magazine reviews, the shepherd Jether longed for the city and, after getting his inheritance from his father, joined the caravan in which was the woman he loved, Tisha, priestess of the pagan goddess Ishtar. He wasted his wealth on fine clothes, jewels for Tisha, and gambling. Though warned of the destruction of the city that was imminent, he continued to live in riot. However, he would not deny God, and, when his money failed, Tisha threw him off. A great feast to Tisha was held in the city and, while it was in progress, the city was destroyed. Jether escaped and became a swineherd for a rich man and subsisted on the husks of the corn he fed his charges. At length, he reached the home of his father and was accepted back into the family.

Cast

Preservation
An incomplete print of the film survives.

References

External links

Lobby poster
Lobby poster
Stills at www.silentfilmstillarchive.com

1925 drama films
1925 films
American films based on plays
Films directed by Raoul Walsh
Paramount Pictures films
American silent feature films
American black-and-white films
Silent American drama films
1920s American films